Shaun Michael Brogan (24 May 1944 – 9 July 2017) was a major in the Special Air Service who received the Military Cross for his part in the Dhofar campaign.

References 

1944 births
2017 deaths
Special Air Service officers
Recipients of the Military Cross
Neurological disease deaths in the United Kingdom
Deaths from Parkinson's disease
British military personnel of the Dhofar Rebellion
People educated at Ratcliffe College
Royal Anglian Regiment officers
People from Stamford, Lincolnshire
British military personnel of the Aden Emergency
Alumni of Lincoln College, Oxford